George Miles may refer to:

 George Miles (organist) (1913–1988), English organist and organ teacher
 George Henry Miles (1824–1871), American writer
 George Miles (politician) (1873–1952), Australian politician
 George Miles (Michigan jurist) (1789–1850), American jurist
 George Herbert Miles, brother of Frederick George Miles of Miles Aircraft Ltd.